Baeonoma is a genus of moths in the subfamily Stenomatinae.

Species
Baeonoma euphanes Meyrick, 1916
Baeonoma favillata (Meyrick, 1915)
Baeonoma helotypa Meyrick, 1916
Baeonoma holarga Meyrick, 1916
Baeonoma infamis Meyrick, 1925
Baeonoma leucodelta (Meyrick, 1914)
Baeonoma leucophaeella (Walker, 1864)
Baeonoma mastodes Meyrick, 1916
Baeonoma orthozona Meyrick, 1916
Baeonoma suavis Meyrick, 1916

References

 
Stenomatinae
Moth genera
Taxa named by Edward Meyrick